Ayub Khoso (born 1959) is a Pakistani actor of film and TV. With a career spanning more than three decades - mostly in television - Khoso is a well-known name in Pakistan. He is known for his roles in films like Khuda Kay Liye.

Early life

Khoso was born to a Pashtun mother and a Baloch father. He began his acting career in school. His first appearance on TV was the drama Chaon that was telecast from PTV Quetta Centre.

He is a graduate of the University of Balochistan. He is fluent in Balochi, Pashto, Brahui, Sindhi, Urdu and English.

Career

Television Dramas 

  Shantul (1994)
  Zanjeer (2000)
 Mahnoor (2004)
  Sassi (2005)
  Sadori (2006)
  Shela Bagh (2008)
 Mehmaan Nawaz (2016)
 Sham Se Pehlay (2016)
 Rasmein (2017–18)
 Rubaru Tha Ishq (2018)

Filmography

Awards and nominations

Tribute

In 2011 the Pakistan National Council of Arts dedicated an evening to Khoso in recognition for his contribution to the television industry in Pakistan. A play titled Main kaun hoon (Who am I) was screened to showcase his work. The play was directed by Shoaib Khaliq and acted by Khoso himself.

Political career 
Ayub Khoso contested on a Pakistan Peoples Party ticket from the PS-101(Karachi East-III) seat in the 2018 Pakistan general elections. In the election, he secured 5121 votes and lost from Firdous Naqvi of Pakistan Tehreek-e-Insaf.

References

External links
 

Living people
Pakistani dramatists and playwrights
Pakistani male film actors
Pakistani television hosts
Pakistani male television actors
20th-century Pakistani male actors
21st-century Pakistani male actors
Baloch people
University of Balochistan alumni
PTV Award winners
Baloch male actors
1959 births